The 39th Writers Guild of America Awards honored the best television, and film writers of 1986. Winners were announced in 1987.

Winners & Nominees

Film 
Winners are listed first highlighted in boldface.

Television

Special Awards

References

External links 

 WGA.org

1986
W
1986 in American cinema
1986 in American television